Valentin Buzmakov (born 17 April 1985) is a former Russian handball player for the Russian national team. Currently he is a head coach for Permskie Medvedi.

He competed at the 2016 European Men's Handball Championship.

References

1985 births
Living people
Russian male handball players
Sportspeople from Astrakhan